Upper Hay River 212 is an Indian reserve of the Dene Tha' First Nation in Alberta, located within Mackenzie County. It is 80 kilometres northwest of High Level. In the 2016 Canadian Census, it recorded a population of 294 living in 98 of its 115 total private dwellings.

References

Indian reserves in Alberta